Romantic Errors of Our Youth is the debut studio album from Leeds based punk rock band Brawlers. It was released on April 6, 2015 through Alcopop! Records.

Track listing

Personnel
Brawlers
Anthony Wright - Bass
Tom Knox - Drums
Matthew Wright - Guitar
Harry Johns - Vocals

References

2015 debut albums
Alcopop! Records albums